Melancholia is a South Korean television series directed by Kim Sang-hyeob and starring Im Soo-jung, Lee Do-hyun, Jin Kyung, and Jang Hyun-sung. The series tells the story of scandals and corruption in private high schools in Gangnam. It premiered as tvN's 15th anniversary special project on tvN on November 10, 2021 and aired on Wednesdays and Thursdays at 22.30 (KST) till December 30. It is available for streaming on iQIYI and Viu in selected territories.

Synopsis
Melancholia tells the story of Ji Yoon-soo (played by Im Soo-jung) a mathematics teacher at the prestigious private Ahseong High School which is also a hotbed of corruptions. She is good-natured on the outside but gets very tenacious and stubborn once she makes up her mind about something. Extremely passionate about math, she is a teacher who encourages her students to find their own answers. At the school, she meets Baek Seung-yoo (played by Lee Do-hyun), a troubled student who is at the bottom of the class. She notices his potential in math, and with her attention and interactions with him, Seung-yoo's grades rises and becomes number one in the class.

Baek Seung-yoo himself is a student who rarely talks, but he likes to take pictures with his camera. He has no friends at school, but he has a shocking past. When he was a child, he won many mathematical olympiads. When he was 10 years old, he entered the Massachusetts Institute of Technology in the United States, but he suddenly disappeared at the age of 12.

Yoon-soo never knew that her attention and interactions with Seung-yoo would create rumors of a teacher-student sexual scandal among other students and parents, which results in her being fired from her job. Four years later, Yoon-soo and Seung-yoo meet again. Now both as adults, they unite to expose the corruptions at Ahseong High School, and to regain Yoon-soo's reputation as a teacher.

Cast

Main
 Im Soo-jung as Ji Yoon-soo, a math teacher.
 Cha Jung-hyun as young Ji Yoon-soo
 Lee Do-hyun as Baek Seung-yoo / Baek Min-jae, a math genius.
 Choi Seung-hoon as young Baek Seung-yoo / Baek Min-jae

Supporting

Asung High School
 Jeon Jin-ki as Choi Seong-han, principal of Asung High School which is affiliated with Asung Academy Foundation.
 Jin Kyung as Noh Jung-ah, head of the school administration at Ahsung High School. 
 Woo Da-vi as Seong Ye-rin, Min-joon's and Hye Mi's daughter, first student at Asung High School.
 Oh Hye-won as Noh Yeon-woo, the second daughter of the president of Asung Academy and the principal of Ahsung International Middle School.
 Choi Woo-sung as Jang Gyu-yeong, second in the entire school who he is always jealous of Baek Seung-yoo.
 Yang Jo-ah as Kim Jin-hee, a teacher of the Korean language department at Asung High School and the homeroom teacher of the 8th grade in the second year.
 Kim Mi-hye as Ahn Seong-go, a math teacher at Ahseong High School.
 Lee Kang-ji as Lee Hyun-jae, a close friend of Seung-yoo.
 Lee Sang-jin as Park Hyun-do, a close friend of Baek Seung-yoo. He is lively bright and honest, and join dance club Together with Seung-yoo and Hyun-jae.
Son Jin-hwan as Oh Jin-taek, principal of Asung High School, a famous private high school in South Korea's 1st education district.
Kim Ji-young as Kim Ji-na, the only daughter of Noh Jung-ah, head of school affairs at Asung High School, as Little Paris Hilton, she is friendly under her mother's shadow, outspoken, neglects her friends, and does evil.
 Shin Soo-yeon as Choi Si-an
 Park Sung-yeon as Yoo Seon-ah	
 Lee Da-yeon as Kyung Soo-young, the daughter of Minister Kyung-min, who borrows her father's powers to transfer Ah Sung High School.

Others
 Choi Dae-hoon as Ryoo Seong-jae, Yoon Soo's fiance, a policy advisor at the Office of Education.
 Jang Hyun-sung as Seong Min-joon, a parent of a student at Asung High School and a member of the National Assembly.
 Byun Jung-soo as Yoo Hye-mi, a top actress, wife of Seong Min-jun.
 Baek Ji-won as Min Hee-seung, Baek Seung Yu's mother.
 Kim Ho-jin as Baek Min-sik, a psychiatrist in Hangok-dong.
 Sunwoo as Jenny's Mother, a mother who works hard for her daughter Jenny's education.
 Oh Kwang-rok as Ji Hyun-wook, Ji Yoon-soo's father.
 Lee Se-na as Jo Yoon-ah, a radio station reporter.

Production
In April 2021, Im Soo-jung was offered to cast in the TV series. Her agency, King Kong, reported that they were considering it positively. Im Soo-jung is appearing in series after hiatus of two years as she last appeared in 2019 tvN series 
Search: WWW. The line-up for cast was confirmed in July 2021. 
Sun Woo is appearing in the series after a hiatus of 7 years. She last appeared in 2014 series Family Secret.

On October 31, 2021 it was reported that 4 staff members at filming site were found positive of COVID-19 and as per safety guidelines the production was suspended. As this would affect the smooth flow of broadcast of the series, airing of first episode was postponed for a week.

Release
The series was scheduled to premiere on November 3, 2021 but due to contagion of COVID-19  at the filming site the premiere was postponed to November 10.

Original soundtrack

Part 1

Part 2

Part 3

Part 4

Viewership

References

External links
   
 Melancholia at Daum 
  Melancholia at Naver 
 
 
 Melancholia at iQiyi

TVN (South Korean TV channel) television dramas
2021 South Korean television series debuts
2021 South Korean television series endings
Korean-language television shows
South Korean melodrama television series
Television series by Studio Dragon
Television series by Bon Factory Worldwide
Television productions suspended due to the COVID-19 pandemic